is a Japanese manga series written and illustrated by Kenji Taguchi. It was serialized in Shogakukan's Weekly Shōnen Sunday from September 2012 to April 2016, with its chapters collected in twelve tankōbon volumes. A 3-episode original video animation (OVA) produced by Brain's Base was released from September 2014 to April 2015.

Characters

Media

Manga
Ane Log: Moyako Nēsan no Tomaranai Monologue, written and illustrated by Kenji Taguchi, was serialized in Shogakukan's Weekly Shōnen Sunday from September 19, 2012, to April 20, 2016. Shogakukan collected its chapters in twelve tankōbon volumes, released from May 17, 2013, to June 17, 2016.

Volume list

Drama CD
A drama CD was bundled with the limited edition of the second manga volume on September 18, 2013.

Anime
A fan disc, which included 6-episode flash anime and 3 short special episodes, was released on April 18, 2014. An original video animation, produced by Brain's Base and directed by Tetsuo Ichimura, with scripts by Natsuko Takahashi and character designs by Eriko Itō, was bundled with the limited edition of the 5th manga volume on September 16, 2014. A second episode was bundled with the limited edition of the 6th manga volume on December 16, 2014. A third episode was bundled with the limited edition of the 7th manga volume on April 15, 2015. In June 2021, Sentai Filmworks announced that they licensed the OVAs for digital and home video releases.

See also
My One-Hit Kill Sister, another manga series illustrated by Kenji Taguchi

References

External links
Ane Log official manga website at Web Sunday 
Ane Log official anime website 

Brain's Base
Comedy anime and manga
OVAs based on manga
Sentai Filmworks
Shogakukan manga
Shōnen manga